The secretary of transportation (Filipino: Kalihim ng Transportasyon) is the head of the Department of Transportation and is a member of the president’s Cabinet.

The current secretary is Jaime Bautista, who assumed office on June 30, 2022.

List of secretaries of transportation

References

External links
DOTr official website

 
Philippines
Philippines
Transportation and Communications